Jackson Thomas White (born 5 August 1997) is an Australian professional basketball player for the Denver Nuggets of the National Basketball Association (NBA), on a two-way contract with the Grand Rapids Gold of the NBA G League. He played college basketball for the Duke Blue Devils.

Early life
A native of Traralgon, White played basketball at the Australian Institute of Sport in Canberra, where he was recruited by several NCAA Division I programs. In 2016, he was called up to play for the Cairns Taipans of the National Basketball League (NBL) as an injury replacement.

College career
White played college basketball for the Duke Blue Devils for four seasons. He was selected to be team captain in his final two years. In his junior season, White averaged 20.5 minutes per game off the bench on a team that featured the top-3 players in the 2018 recruiting class: Zion Williamson, RJ Barrett, and Cam Reddish. As a senior, White averaged 3.1 points and 2.9 rebounds per game shooting 38.7 percent from the field and 72.2 percent from the free throw line. He was an ACC All-Academic selection.

Professional career

Melbourne United (2020–2022)
On 15 July 2020, White signed a three-year deal with Melbourne United of the NBL.

Denver Nuggets (2022–present)

In July 2022, White went to the United States to join the Denver Nuggets for NBA Summer League. On 19 July 2022, he signed a two-way contract with the Nuggets.

National team career
White has represented Australia at many international junior tournaments. He won a silver medal at the 2014 FIBA Under-17 World Championship in Dubai. At the 2015 FIBA Under-19 World Championship in Heraklion, White averaged 8.3 points and 3.9 rebounds per game. In 2019, he helped his team win bronze at the Summer Universiade in Italy.

White made his senior national team debut in the third window of the 2023 FIBA World Cup Asian Qualifiers. He averaged 10 points and 7.3 rebounds per game and featured with a career high performance against China with a 16 point, 14 rebound double-double.

Career statistics

College

|-
| style="text-align:left;"| 2016–17
| style="text-align:left;"| Duke
| 10 || 0 || 6.1 || .667 || .500 || .800 || 1.3 || .1 || .1 || .2 || 2.1
|-
| style="text-align:left;"| 2017–18
| style="text-align:left;"| Duke
| 28 || 0 || 5.7 || .409 || .167 || 1.000 || 1.5 || .3 || .3 || .2 || .8
|-
| style="text-align:left;"| 2018–19
| style="text-align:left;"| Duke
| 35 || 3 || 20.5 || .359 || .278 || .852 || 4.7 || .7 || .6 || 1.1 || 4.1
|-
| style="text-align:left;"| 2019–20
| style="text-align:left;"| Duke
| 30 || 7 || 15.6 || .388 || .327 || .722 || 2.9 || .8 || .7 || .7 || 3.1
|- class="sortbottom"
| style="text-align:center;" colspan="2"| Career
| 103 || 10 || 13.6 || .384 || .288 || .807 || 3.0 || .6 || .5 || .7 || 2.7

References

External links
NBL profile
Duke Blue Devils bio

Living people
1997 births
Australian expatriate basketball people in the United States
Australian men's basketball players
Cairns Taipans players
Denver Nuggets players
Duke Blue Devils men's basketball players
Grand Rapids Gold players
Medalists at the 2019 Summer Universiade
Melbourne United players
National Basketball Association players from Australia
People from Traralgon
Small forwards
Sportsmen from Victoria (Australia)
Undrafted National Basketball Association players
Universiade bronze medalists for Australia
Universiade medalists in basketball